The UK Protected Persons Service (UKPPS) is an service provided by the government of the United Kingdom that provides personal protection to people at risk of serious harm, such as those requiring witness protection or at threat from domestic abuse, honour-based violence, or organized crime. It works with the National Crime Agency and British police forces. The service can provide protected people with new identities and homes. 

The UKPPS was set up in 2013, and was reorganized to be under centralized control by the National Crime Agency in 2019. , the service provided protection for around 3000 people at a cost of around £20 million per year.

Section 4 of the Serious Organised Crime and Police Act 2005 makes provision for witness protection services.

References

External links 
 BBC Newsnight report on the activities of the UKPPS

Law enforcement agencies of the United Kingdom
National Crime Agency
Witness protection